Rick Treadway (born January 15, 1970 in Indianapolis, Indiana), is a former racing driver for the Indy Racing League.  He raced in the 2001 and 2002 seasons with 11 career starts, including the 2002 Indianapolis 500.

Rick Treadway is the son of Fred Treadway, owner of Treadway Racing, the team which won the 1997 Indianapolis 500.

Racing record

American Open Wheel
(key)

IndyCar results

References

External links

1970 births
Indianapolis 500 drivers
IndyCar Series drivers
Living people
Racing drivers from Indianapolis
USAC Silver Crown Series drivers